Little Forter is a hamlet in Glen Isla, Angus, Scotland.

References

Villages in Angus, Scotland